The Kashi Vishwanath Temple is a famous Hindu temple dedicated to Lord Shiva. It is located in Vishwanath Gali of Varanasi, Uttar Pradesh in India. The temple stands on the western bank of the holy river Ganga, and is one of the twelve Jyotirlingas, the holiest of Shiva temples. The main deity is known by the names Shri Vishwanath and Vishweshwara (IAST: Vishveshvara or Vishveshvur) literally meaning Lord of the Universe. Varanasi was called Kashi ("shining") in ancient times, and hence the temple is popularly called Kashi Vishwanath Temple.

The temple is considered a central part of worship in the Shaiva culture by Hindu scriptures. It had been demolished several times by the Muslim rulers, most recently by Aurangzeb who constructed the Gyanvapi Mosque on its site. The current structure was built on an adjacent site by the Maratha ruler, Ahilyabai Holkar of Indore in the year 1780.

Since 1983, the temple has been managed by the government of Uttar Pradesh.

Legends 

As per the Shiva Purana,  Brahma (the Hindu God of creation) and Lord Vishnu (the Hindu God of Preservation) once had an argument about supremacy. To test their powers, Shiva pierced the three mystical states of the earth as a huge endless pillar of light, the known by jyotirlinga.At first lord Vishnu incarnated to Boar (Varaha) form dug the earth to search the base of the pillar while Brahma in the form of a swan search the sky to find the top of pillar. Mistaken by self arrogance Brahma falsely claimed to have found the top, then offered a katuki flower as his witness. However, Vishnu confessed modestly of his failure to locate the base. Shiva then took the form of the wrathful Bhairava, cut off Brahma's fifth head as a punishment, and then cursed Brahma not be worshipped. Vishnu for his honesty would be worshiped as equal to Shiva with his own temples for all eternity. The jyotirlinga is an ancient axis mundi symbol representing the supreme formless (nirguna) reality at the core of creation, out of which the form (saguna) of Shiva appears. The jyothirlinga shrines, thus are places where Shiva appeared as a fiery column of light. There are 64 forms of Shiva, not to be confused with Jyotirlingas.  Each of the twelve jyotirlinga sites take the name of the presiding deity - each considered different manifestation of Lord Shiva.  At all these sites, the primary image is lingam representing the beginningless and endless Stambha pillar, symbolizing the infinite nature of Shiva. The twelve jyothirlinga are Somnath in Gujarat, Mallikarjuna at Srisailam in Andhra Pradesh, Mahakaleswar at Ujjain in Madhya Pradesh, Omkareshwar in Madhya Pradesh, Kedarnath in Uttarakhand, Bhimashankar in Maharashtra, Viswanath at Varanasi in Uttar Pradesh, Triambakeshwar in Maharashtra, Vaidyanath Jyotirlinga, Deogarh in Deoghar, Jharkhand,  Nageswar at Dwarka in Gujarat, Rameshwar at Rameswaram in Tamil Nadu and Grishneshwar at Aurangabad in Maharashtra.

The Manikarnika Ghat is on the bank of the river Ganges. This holy site is very near to the Kashi Vishwanath Temple, and is named as a Shakti Pitha, a revered place of worship for the Shaktism sect. The Daksha Yaga, an important Shaivite literature also mentions the origin of Shakti Peethas.

Mythology describes Lord Vishweshara is to be the sacred deity of Varanasi, holding the position of king over all the other deities, as well as over all inhabitants of the city and the extended circuit of the Panchkosi an area (the sacred boundary of Varanasi) spreading over 50 miles.

History 
Madhuri Desai notes accounts of the history of the temple to center around a litany of repeated destruction and re-construction. Pilgrims visiting the present Kashi Vishwanath Temple are informed about the timelessness of the lingam.

Ancient and classical period 
The temple is mentioned in the Puranas including the Kashi Khanda (section) of Skanda Purana(4th-5th century).

Medieval period and destruction 

The original Vishwanath temple, initially known as the Adi Vishveshwara Temple, was destroyed by the Ghurids in 1194, when Mu'izz al-Din Muhammad ibn Sam returned to India and defeated Jayachandra of Kannauj near Chandawar and afterwards razed the city of Kashi. In few years time, Razia Mosque was constructed in its place. In 1230, the temple was rebuilt near the Avimukteshwara Temple, away from the main site by a Gujarati merchant during the reign of Delhi's Sultan Iltutmish (1211–1266) . It was demolished again during the rule of either Hussain Shah Sharqi (1447–1458) or Sikandar Lodi (1489–1517).

Mughal period 

Raja Man Singh built the temple during Mughal emperor Akbar's rule. Raja Todar Mal further re-built the temple in 1585, but orthodox Brahmins chose to boycott the temple, because his daughter was married to Islamic rulers. During the rule of Jahangir, Vir Singh Deo either restored or completed the construction of earlier temple. In 1669, Mughal emperor Aurangzeb destroyed the temple and built the Gyanvapi Mosque in its place. The remains of the erstwhile temple can be seen in the foundation, the columns and at the rear part of the mosque.

Maratha and British period 

In 1742, the Maratha ruler Malhar Rao Holkar made a plan to demolish the mosque and reconstruct Vishweshwar temple at the site. However, his plan did not materialize, partially because of intervention by the Nawab of Awadh, who was given the control of the territory. Around 1750, the Maharaja of Jaipur commissioned a survey of the land around the site, with the objective of purchasing land to rebuild the Kashi Vishwanath temple. However, his plan to rebuild the temple did not materialize either. In 1780, Malhar Rao's daughter-in-law Ahilyabai Holkar rebuilt the present temple adjacent to the mosque.

IIn 1828, Baiza Bai, widow of the Maratha ruler Daulat Rao Scindhia of Gwalior State, built a low-roofed colonnade with over 40 pillars in the Gyan Vapi precinct. During 1833–1840, the boundary of Gyanvapi Well, the ghats and other nearby temples were constructed. Many noble families from various ancestral kingdoms of the Indian subcontinent and their prior establishments make generous contributions for the operations of the temple.

In 1835, Maharaja Ranjit Singh of the Sikh Empire, on the behest of his wife, Maharani Datar Kaur, donated 1 tonne of gold for plating the temple's dome. In 1841, Raghuji Bhonsle III of Nagpur donated silver to the temple. A 7-foot high stone statue of Nandi, gifted by the Rana of Nepal sometime in the 1860s lies to the east of the colonnade.

The temple was managed by a hereditary group of pandits or mahants. After the death of Mahant Devi Dutt, a dispute arose among his successors. In 1900, his brother-in-law Pandit Visheshwar Dayal Tewari filed a lawsuit, which resulted in him being declared the head priest.

Post-Independence 
The puja of the Maa Shringar Gauri Temple, at the western side of the disputed Gyanvapi Mosque, was restricted after the demolition of the Babri Masjid in December 1992 due to the ensuing deadly riots that followed the demolition of the mosque. In August 2021, five Hindu women petitioned a local court at Varanasi to be allowed to pray at the Maa Shringar Gauri Temple.

In 2019, the Kashi Vishwanath Corridor Project was launched by Narendra Modi to ease access between the temple and the Ganges River, creating a wider space to prevent overcrowding. On 13 December 2021, Modi inaugurated the corridor with a sacred ceremony. A press release by the government said that around 1,400 residents and businesses within the corridor's area were relocated elsewhere and compensated. It also said that more than 40 ruined, centuries-old temples were found and rebuilt, including the Gangeshwar Mahadev temple, the Manokameshwar Mahadev temple, the Jauvinayak temple, and the Shri Kumbha Mahadev temple. 

However, many temples were destroyed and relocated from their original places. The original Panchayatna form of the temple was distorted as the four temples of Devi Bhog Annapurna, Sri Lakshmi Narayan, Sri Avimukteshwara Mahadeva and Devi Parvati surrounding the main temple were destroyed during the construction of the Kashi Vishwanath Corridor.

In February 2022, the sanctum sanctorum of the temple was gold-plated after an anonymous donor from South India donated 60 kg of gold to the temple. Flowers from the temple are recycled into incense by the biomaterials startup Phool.co.

The Kashi Vishwanath Temple-Gyanwapi Mosque Dispute 

The Gyanvapi Mosque complex is a disputed structure that was constructed by the Mughal emperor Aurangzeb over the ruins of the desecrated ancient Kashi Vishwanath Temple after it was defiled several times by Islamic rulers like Qutb al-Din Aibak and Aurangzeb.

Till this day, parts of this ancient temple are clearly visible on the outer walls of the mosque. The statues of the bull Nandi and Maa Shringaar Gauri can be seen even from a distance.

The site has been the centre of a dispute between the Hindu and the Muslim communities over its ownership since 1936.

Temple structure 

The temple complex consists of a series of smaller shrines, located in a small lane called the Vishwanatha Galli, near the river. The main temple is quadrangle and is surrounded by shrines of other gods. There are small temples for Kala Bhairava, Kartikeya, Avimukteshwara, Vishnu, Ganesha, Shani, Shiva and Parvati in the complex.

There is a small well in the temple called the Jnana Vapi also spelled as Gyan vapi (the wisdom well). The Jnana Vapi well sites to the north of the main temple and during the invasion by the Mughals the Jyotirlinga was hidden in the well to protect it at the time of invasion. It is said that the main priest of the temple jumped in the well with the lingam in order to protect the Jyotirlinga from invaders.

There is a Sabha Griha or Congregation Hall leading to the inner Garbha Griha or Sanctum Sanctorum. The venerable Jyotirlinga is a dark brown colored stone which is enshrined in the Sanctum, placed on a silver platform. Structure of the Mandir is composed of three parts. The first compromises a spire on the temple. The second is gold dome and the third is the gold spire atop the sanctum bearing a flag and a trident.

The Kashi Vishwanath temple receives around 3,000 visitors every day. On certain occasions, the numbers reach 1,000,000 and more. Noteworthy about the temple is 15.5-metre-high gold spire and gold Onion dome. There are three domes each made up of pure gold, donated by Maharaja Ranjit Singh in 1835.

The Shri Kashi Vishwanath Dham corridor was constructed between Kashi Vishwanath Temple and Manikarnika Ghat along the Ganges River, providing various amenities for pilgrims.

Importance 
Located on the banks of the holy Ganges, Varanasi is regarded among the holiest of the Hindu cities. The Kashi Vishwanath temple is widely recognized as one of the most important places of worship in the Hindu religion. Inside the Kashi Vishwanath Temple is the Jyotirlinga of Shiva, Vishveshvara or Vishvanath. The Vishveshvara Jyotirlinga has a very special and unique significance in the spiritual history of India.

Many leading saints, including Adi Sankaracharya, Ramakrishna Paramhansa, Swami Vivekananda, Bamakhyapa, Goswami Tulsidas, Swami Dayananda Saraswati, Sathya Sai Baba, Yogiji Maharaj, Pramukh Swami Maharaj, Mahant Swami Maharaj and Gurunanak have visited the site. A visit to the temple and a bath in the river Ganges is one of many methods believed to lead one on a path to Moksha (liberation). Thus, Hindus from all over the world try to visit the place at least once in their lifetime. There is also a tradition that one should give up at least one desire after a pilgrimage the temple, and the pilgrimage would also include a visit to the temple at Rameswaram in Tamil Nadu in Southern India, where people take water samples of the Ganges to perform prayer at the temple and bring back sand from near that temple. Because of the immense popularity and holiness of Kashi Vishwanath temple, hundreds of temples across India have been built in the same architectural style. Many legends record that the true devotee achieves freedom from death and saṃsāra by the worship of Shiva, Shiva's devotees on death being directly taken to his abode on Mount Kailash by his messengers and not to Yama. The superiority of Shiva and his victory over his own nature—Shiva is himself identified with death—is also stated. There is a popular belief that Shiva himself blows the mantra of salvation into the ears of people who die naturally at the Vishwanath temple.

It is one of the shrines of the Vaippu Sthalams sung by Tamil Saivite Nayanar Sambandar.

Pitru tharpanam or Pinda Dhaan 
At Dr.Rajendra prasad ghat, if one crosses over to the other side of the river, numerous priest offer pind dhaan services.

Accommodation 
From Kashi railway station, the temple is around 4kms, one can find all sorts of transport to reach the temple. There are various dharmshalas, paying guest rooms, and other hotels and lodges available for various prices. The temple's official website does redirect to accommodation.

Cultural events 

Phalgun Shukla Ekadashi is celebrated as Rangabhari Ekadashi, that is, colors. According to tradition, before Holi, Baba Vishwanath comes back to Kashi after having a cow in the form of mother Bhagwati. The temple complex is echoed by the echo of dozens of Damroos. This tradition has been performed for over 200 years. On Basant Panchami Baba's Tilak is performed, Shivaratri marriage and Rangbhari Ekadashi marks parvati leaving with shiva. These traditions are carried out by the erstwhile Mahant family of the temple for over a century.

These rituals of Baba's marriage ceremony are performed at the residence of Kulpati Tiwari, the erstwhile Mahant of Shri Kashi Vishwanath Temple in Redzone. The seven rituals of Saptarishi Aarti were performed by Baba Vishwanath. According to the Puranas, Kashi is loved by the Saptarishi to the priest, so according to the tradition, the devotees of the Saptarishi Aarti perform the rituals of marriage. The seven archaks under the leadership of Pradhan Archak Pandit Shashibhushan Tripathi (Guddu Maharaj) completed the marriage in Vedic rituals. Mangala Aarti is performed at 3:30 am, Bhog Aarti at 12:00 pm, Saptarishi Aaarti at 7:30 pm and Shringar Aaarti at 11:00 pm. 

Yadav community of Kashi associated with Chandravanshi Gop Seva Samiti and Shree Krishna Yadav Mahasabha have been performing jalabhishek on shivling traditionally since 90 years, first started in 1932.

See also 

Shri Vishwanath Mandir
Mrityunjay Mahadev Mandir
Ratneshwar Mahadev temple
List of Hindu temples in Varanasi
Nandmahar Dham
Mata Mawai Dham

References

Notes 

.

External links 

Kashi Vishwanath Temple Website
Shri Kashi Vishwanath Mandir, Varanasi

Jyotirlingas
Hindu temples in Varanasi
Religious buildings and structures converted into mosques
Religious buildings and structures completed in 1780
Shiva temples in Varanasi